The Shitbox Rally is a long-distance motoring event run in Australia as a fundraiser for cancer research charities, originally an annual event but increased to twice-yearly in 2019.

History
The event was inaugurated by James Freeman in 2009 in memory of his mother and father, who both died from cancer within a space of twelve months. His idea was to challenge men and women with a sense of adventure to a one-week (or thereabouts) drive across the country in an inexpensive motor vehicle, which would be sold by auction at journey's end; entrance fees and proceeds of the sale to go to a cancer charity, along with any other money that might be collected in the way of donations, sponsorships and royalties. He secured an agreement from Cancer Council Australia to lend its name to the project on the proviso that all monies would be directed to Cancer Council Australia. Freeman estimated a profit of $20,000 in the first year and to get the ball rolling canvassed friends and relations to take part.

The Sydney Morning Herald 's Drive column, Seven Network 's Sunrise program and Unique Cars magazine ran feature stories, and other print and electronic media followed. Triple J arranged for one of their presenters, Tom Tilley, to participate, sending reports back to Sydney, and capturing moments on videotape. 23 two-person teams registered for the event, which raised $103,000, well above the most optimistic predictions.

The event
The event organisers describes the rally as "not a race, [but] rather a challenge to achieve the unthinkable," being fundraiser and community event where participants have a good time doing something challenging. There is an award presented to the biggest fundraisers, and other awards are given in various light-hearted categories which may change at the whim of the organisers: "Least likely to make it"; "Best car"; "Best team theme" (dressing up the vehicle is part of the fun, but not mandatory); "Best breakdown"; "Best repair"; "Spirit of the Rally".

The number of entries is limited to 200.

Effectively, a team of two needs to raise a minimum of $5,000, which goes straight to Cancer Council Australia, to participate in the rally. The only stipulations for the car are that it is worth/valued at no more than A$1,000 and that it's not an AWD/4WD vehicle. Costs of vehicle registration and roadworthiness checks are not included in the budget, nor are some safety items. Teams are responsible for getting the vehicle to the starting point, and proceed each day to that night's checkpoint, where they sleep "under the stars" (BYO swag). Breakfast, lunch and dinner are provided. There is an auction held following the last day, where optionally, the vehicles are sold to benefit Cancer Council Australia.

Events

References

Gallery

External links 
Shitbox Rally official website

Motorsport in Australia
Rallying in Australia
Recurring events established in 2010
2010 establishments in Australia